William Keith Eltham (11 October 1886 – 31 December 1916) was an Australian cricketer. He played eleven first-class matches for Tasmania between 1909 and 1914. He was killed in action during World War I.

See also
 List of Tasmanian representative cricketers
 List of cricketers who were killed during military service

References

External links
 

1886 births
1916 deaths
Australian cricketers
Tasmania cricketers
Cricketers from Hobart
Australian military personnel killed in World War I